Zaneta Josseline Wyne (born August 3, 1990) is an American professional soccer player who currently plays as a fullback for Racing Louisville FC in the National Women's Soccer League.

Early life and education
Wyne attended Aliso Niguel High School in Orange County, California where she played for the girls varsity team. She graduated from the University of New Mexico, and played for San Diego WFC SeaLions in the Women's Premier Soccer League (WPSL).

Club career

GBK Kokkola
Wyne played for Finnish club GBK Kokkola in 2013 followed by Iceland's Víkingur Ólafsvík in 2014. In 2015, she moved to Cyprus' Apollon Ladies F.C. where they qualified for the UEFA Women's Champions League, which Wyne participated in. In 2016, Wyne returned to Iceland to play for Þór/KA after a suggestion from former Apollon player Cecilia Santiago as they felt she was a like-for-like replacement for fellow American Heid Ragne who had to return to the United States. In 2016, she temporarily returned to the United States to play for Atlanta Silverbacks in the WPSL.

Sunderland
In 2017, Wyne moved to England to play for FA WSL 1 side Sunderland on the transfer deadline day before Þór/KA's final two league fixtures. Þór/KA agreed to release Wyne to Sunderland early as they did not want to stop Wyne taking advantage of the opportunity to play for Sunderland Ladies.

Klepp IL
Wyne signed with Norwegian side Klepp IL for the 2018 season. She scored her first goal for the club during the team's 1-1 draw against Vålerenga on September 9. During a 5-3 win against IK Grand Bodø, she scored two goals in the 28th and 59th minutes. Klepp IL finished in second place during the 2018 Toppserien with a  record. Zyne's two goals tied for fifth highest on the squad.

Glasgow City
In July 2020, Wyne signed for Scottish side Glasgow City.

West Ham United
In June 2021, Wyne signed with FA Women's Super League side West Ham United. She rejoined manager Olli Harder whom she had previously played under at Klepp IL.

Racing Louisville
Wyne signed with NWSL club Racing Louisville in late June 2022 as a national team replacement player. By the end of July, Racing had signed her to a permanent contract through the end of the 2023 NWSL season.

Personal life
Wyne holds both American and French citizenship.

Honors
Apollon Limassol
 Cypriot First Division winner: 2015-16
 Cypriot Women's Cup winner: 2016

References

External links
 Racing Louisville FC profile
 
 
 College profile
 English profile
 

Living people
1990 births
American expatriate sportspeople in England
American women's soccer players
Expatriate women's footballers in England
Apollon Ladies F.C. players
Sunderland A.F.C. players
University of New Mexico alumni
Zaneta Wyne
Zaneta Wyne
New Mexico Lobos women's soccer players
Glasgow City F.C. players
West Ham United F.C. Women players
Racing Louisville FC players
Aliso Niguel High School alumni
Women's association football midfielders
National Women's Soccer League players